Henry Cooke may refer to:
Henry Cooke (composer) (c. 1616–1672), English composer
Henry Cooke (artist) (1642–1700), British painter
Henry Cooke (minister) (1788–1868), Irish presbyterian leader
Henry D. Cooke (1825–1881), first territorial governor of the District of Columbia
Henry D. Cooke (admiral) (1879–1958), rear admiral and grandson of Henry D. Cooke
Henry Cooke (Australian politician) (1840–1903), Australian politician
Henry Frederick Cooke (1784–1837), British soldier

See also
Henry Cook (disambiguation)